Cheshmeh Panbeh is a village in Hasanabad Rural District, in the Central District of Ravansar County, Kermanshah Province, Iran. At the 2006 census, its population was 79, in 17 families.

References 

Populated places in Ravansar County